Inter IIT Sports Meet is the annual sports tournament of the Indian Institutes of Technology. It is organized in December, with the Aquatics events held separately in October. It is the longest running Inter-collegiate meet where all IITs participate having been held since 1961.

Sports and participating institutes 
Tournaments are held in 13 different sports, namely:
 Athletics
 Badminton
 Basketball
 Cricket
 Football
 Hockey
 Lawn tennis
 Squash
 Swimming
 Table tennis
 Volleyball
 Water polo
 Weightlifting

All the 23 IITs participating in the Inter-IIT Sports Meet:
 Indian Institute of Technology Bhilai
 Indian Institute of Technology Bhubaneshwar
 Indian Institute of Technology (BHU) Varanasi
Indian Institute of Technology Bombay
 Indian Institute of Technology Delhi
Indian Institute of Technology (Indian School of Mines) Dhanbad
Indian Institute of Technology Dharwad
 Indian Institute of Technology Gandhinagar
Indian Institute of Technology Goa
 Indian Institute of Technology Guwahati
Indian Institute of Technology Hyderabad
Indian Institute of Technology Indore
Indian Institute of Technology Jammu
Indian Institute of Technology Jodhpur
 Indian Institute of Technology Kanpur
 Indian Institute of Technology Kharagpur
 Indian Institute of Technology Madras
 Indian Institute of Technology Mandi
Indian Institute of Technology Palakkad
 Indian Institute of Technology Patna
 Indian Institute of Technology Roorkee
 Indian Institute of Technology Ropar
 Indian Institute of Technology Tirupati

History 
The proposition for an Inter IIT Sports Meet was brought up in 1961, and IIT Bombay hosted the first ever Inter IIT Sports Meet. Only five IITs were in existence then, namely IIT Bombay, IIT Madras, IIT Kharagpur, IIT Kanpur and IIT Delhi; who competed in five sports only.

History and winners

IITs with most overall wins 

The Meet in 1971 was cancelled due to the India-Pakistan war, while the one in 1992 was to be held at IIT Bombay but was cancelled owing to the communal riots in Mumbai. 
The 2015 meet that was supposed to be held at IIT Madras was washed out due to unpredictable rains.

Recent championships

49th Inter IIT Sports Meet 2013  
The 49th Inter IIT Sports Meet was held at IIT Guwahati from 16 to 23 December 2013. MC Mary Kom launched her autobiography Unbreakable during the ceremony; along with former Miss Universe and Hindi film actress Sushmita Sen.

The mascot for the 49th Inter IIT was Bhaiti, a bamboo. Inspired by the slenderness and strength of its namesake plant, Bhaiti was designed by Thomas G. Manih, a student of (IITG)IIT Guwahati, under the guidance of Dr. D. Udaya Kumar, who is credited with designing the Indian Rupee sign.

IIT Kanpur emerged as the winners of the General Championship in the Men's tournament, while IIT Roorkee won the Women's General Championship.

50th Inter IIT Sports Meet 2014  

The Golden Jubilee edition of the Inter IIT Sports Meet was hosted by IIT Bombay in October and December 2014. The Inter IIT Aquatics Meet took place during 1–4 October 2014. The Opening Ceremony of that was graced by the presence of Virdhawal Khade. The 50th Inter IIT Sports Main Meet took place during 12–19 December 2014 at the IIT Bombay campus. The Opening Ceremony of that was graced by the presence of Cricket legend Sachin Tendulkar. The institute has undertaken massive renovations of the play fields in anticipation of the meet.
Sachin gave the most anticipated address of that day. The last time IIT Bombay hosted an Inter IIT Sports Meet was in 2007, as a part of the Golden Jubilee celebrations of the institute.
IIT Kanpur declared as the overall champions, winners of the General Championship in the Men's tournament and second in the Women's Championship, while IIT Bombay won the Women's General Championship.

51st Inter IIT Sports Meet 2016 
The 51st edition of the Inter IIT Sports Meet was hosted by IIT Kanpur in October and December 2016. The Opening Ceremony of that was graced by the presence of  Paralympic Javelin Thrower Devendra Jhajharia, who won Gold at 2016 Rio Paralympics and is also the current World Paralympic Record Holder in Javelin Throw under F46 events. IIT Madras Aquatic Team has won the Overall Championship in the Inter-IIT Aquatic Meet held at IIT Kanpur during 2 to 5 October 2016  IIT Kanpur continued their winning spirit and emerged as overall champions for third consecutive time.

52nd Inter IIT Sports Meet 2017 
The 52nd edition of the Inter IIT Sports Meet was hosted by IIT Madras in October and December 2017. The Inter IIT Aquatics Meet took place during October. The 52nd Inter IIT Sports Main Meet took place during 15–23 December 2017 at IIT Madras' lush green campus. The Opening Ceremony was graced by the presence of renowned Indian Field Hockey  Team's former Captain Viren Rasquinha, who also is the CEO of Olympic Gold Quest (OGQ). IIT Bombay were declared the Overall Champions.

53rd Inter IIT Sports Meet 2018 

The 53rd Inter IIT Sports Meet was hosted by IIT Guwahati. The 34th Aquatics Meet took place during 3-7 October, while the Main Meet was being hosted in December. This edition held a special significance for IIT Guwahati as it is being conducted to celebrate the silver jubilee of the institute. It was also be the first time when Para-powerlifting event has been introduced.

The Aquatics Meet Opening Ceremony was graced by the presence of Sajan Prakash, the man with the highest number of National Records in short course and long course swimming events. The Chief Guest for the Main Meet's opening ceremony was Shiny Abraham, she has represented India in more than eighty international meets and was the first Indian woman to reach the semi-finals of an Olympic event. The ceremony also had Rio Paralympics gold medalist, Mariyappan Thangavelu as its guest of honor.

53rd Inter IIT sports meet was won by IIT Delhi with 106 points, 26 points clear of the runner up.

55th Inter IIT Sports Meet 2022 
The 55th Inter IIT Sports Meet was hosted jointly by IIT Roorkee and IIT Delhi. This event was held between 14-22 December 2022.

References

External links 
 interiitsports.org - Official website

Indian Institutes of Technology
Student sport in India
Sports competitions in India
2014 in Indian sport